is a former Japanese football player. he the current goalkeeper coach J1 League club of Nagoya Grampus.

Playing career
Kawano was born in Oita Prefecture on 7 November 1970. After graduating from high school, he joined Mazda (later Sanfrecce Hiroshima) in 1989. He was mainly reserve goalkeeper behind Kazuya Maekawa. However from 1992, he played many matches because Maekawa was prone to injuries. In 1995, the club won the 2nd place J1 League. In 1997, he moved to Nagoya Grampus Eight. In September 1997, he moved to Yokohama Marinos on loan. He played many matches instead Japan national team player Yoshikatsu Kawaguchi while left the club for 1998 World Cup qualification. After he returned to Grampus Eight in 1998, he moved to Cerezo Osaka in 1999. He battles with Seigo Shimokawa for the position and he played many matches from 2001. However the club was relegated to J2 League in 2001. In 2002, he played many matches and the club won the 2nd place in J2 League. Althouogh the club was promoted to J1 League from 2003, he retired end of 2002 season.

Coaching career
After the retirement, Kawano started coaching career at Cerezo Osaka in 2003. He mainly served as goalkeeper coach fop youth team until 2013. In 2014, he became a coach for top team.

Club statistics

References

External links

biglobe.ne.jp

1970 births
Living people
Association football people from Ōita Prefecture
Japanese footballers
Japan Soccer League players
J1 League players
J2 League players
Sanfrecce Hiroshima players
Nagoya Grampus players
Yokohama F. Marinos players
Cerezo Osaka players
Association football goalkeepers